Wenlock District Hospital is a hospital in Mangalore, Karnataka, India. Established in 1848, it was acquired by the Madras government in 1891. It contains more than 1000 beds . It is a teaching hospital of the Kasturba Medical College, Mangalore.

History 
The hospital named after the then governor, Beilby Lawley, 3rd Baron Wenlock was established in 1848 during the British Raj when Mangalore was a part of the Madras Presidency. After India's independence, the hospital came under control of the Madras State. In 1955, T. M. A. Pai, the founder of Manipal Academy of Higher Education established the Kasturba Medical College with Wenlock Hospital as the teaching hospital. Mangalore became a part of the Mysore state in 1956.

Teaching Hospital 
The hospital is India's oldest example of a public-private partnership in medical education. KMC Mangalore has signed a Memorandum of Understanding with the Government of Karnataka to use the hospital as a teaching hospital and the college provides healthcare staff and laboratory facilities. The state, through the Karnataka Examinations Authority is the counselling authority for 20% of the MBBS seats at KMC Mangalore.

See also 

 KMC Mangalore
 Manipal Academy of Higher Education
 Healthcare in India
 Medical Education in India

References

1848 establishments in British India
Hospitals in Mangalore